Monolith is a studio album by American hip hop producer Omid. It was released by Mush Records on September 16, 2003.

Critical reception

Thomas Quinlan of Exclaim! wrote: "Although none of the songs on this album are bad, the rigid pattern of instrumental track then vocal track and back again becomes monotonous and breaks up the flow of the two separate entities, especially since the length of the instrumentals prevent them from being simply interludes." Meanwhile, Anna Klafter of SF Weekly wrote: "This combination of instrumentals and guest rappers creates the perfect sonic balance." Rollie Pemberton of Pitchfork gave the album a 6.2 out of 10, saying: "If Omid can manage to master a single style, instead of haphazardly attempting several approaches, he might yet carve his niche in the turbulent underground."

The album was ranked at number 35 on CMJ's "Hip-Hop 2003" chart.

Track listing

Personnel
Credits adapted from liner notes.

 Omid Walizadeh – percussion (13), production, mixing
 Hymnal – vocals (2, 14)
 Nobody – co-production (2)
 Luckyiam.PSC – vocals (4)
 Slug – vocals (4)
 Aceyalone – vocals (4)
 Murs – vocals (4)
 DJ Drez – turntables (4)
 Higo – mixing (4)
 Buck 65 – vocals (6)
 DJ Tetris – turntables (6, 8)
 Abstract Rude – vocals (8)
 2Mex – vocals (8)
 Charmion Callon – flute (8)
 Chris Schlarb – guitar (9)
 Spoon (of Iodine) – vocals (10), co-production (10), human beatbox (10)
 Ceez – mixing (10)
 Busdriver – vocals (12)
 K. Umbra Minor – percussion (13)
 Leila – cello (14)
 David Cooley – mastering

References

External links
 

2003 albums
Mush Records albums
Omid Walizadeh albums